Helmut Spannagl (born 12 January 1962) is an Austrian modern pentathlete. He competed at the 1988 Summer Olympics.

References

1962 births
Living people
Austrian male modern pentathletes
Olympic modern pentathletes of Austria
Modern pentathletes at the 1988 Summer Olympics